Diane Lewis was the Social Security Minister of Guernsey from March 2007 to April 2008 and sat on the Policy Council.

She was elected a Deputy to the States of Guernsey in April 2004 and was voted in as Social Security Minister in March 2007 following the Fallagate Scandal. The vote was close and she beat the incumbent Mary Lowe.

Deputy Lewis represented the St. Peter Port North electoral district until 2008.

References

Year of birth missing (living people)
Living people
Place of birth missing (living people)
Members of the States of Guernsey
Government ministers of Guernsey
Women government ministers of Guernsey
Guernsey women
Guernsey women in politics
21st-century British women politicians